, also known mononymously as Taiji, was a Japanese musician and songwriter. He is best known as the former bassist of the rock band X. X rose to prominence in the late 1980s and early 1990s, credited as founders of the Japanese visual kei movement. After leaving X in January 1992, Taiji went on to work with many other bands, including Loudness and D.T.R.

Early life
Taiji Sawada was born in Ichikawa, Chiba, on July 12, 1966. He was the second son of three children. His younger sister Masayo is a singer known as Sister MAYO. When Taiji was two years of age, he shoved his hand into a machine in a factory where his parents worked, resulting in a first joint cut on the middle finger, but luckily, it was not too serious. In 1974, at age eight, Taiji learned how to play acoustic guitar while in elementary school. In 1979, Taiji's parents were divorced.

Career

1982–1992: Early bands and X
After dropping out of high school in 1982, Taiji formed his first band called Trash, where he was the leader and guitarist. In late 1984, he switched to bass and going by the name Ray joined the metal group Dementia, staying until 1985. He then played briefly with Prowler, as well as a few shows with X. Until 1986 when he joined the very short-lived Dead Wire, whose line-up also included future Saver Tiger and D'erlanger members, Kyo and Tetsu. Soon after he officially rejoined X at the end of 1986.

He wrote several known X compositions, including "Phantom of Guilt", "Desperate Angel" and "Voiceless Screaming". He specially played acoustic guitar on "Voiceless Screaming" during Jealousy tour from 1991 to 1992. In 2001, some of the unpublished songs were finally released in Rose & Blood -Indies of X-. Taiji left X in 1992, the official reason given by the band was due to musical differences. However, in his autobiography, Taiji claimed that he was asked to leave because he confronted Yoshiki due to the substantial income gap between Yoshiki and each of the other members. When asked about Taiji's departure in 2016, Yoshiki said that while he respected Taiji's musical skills, he "crossed the line of our band's rules" and "To this day I still don't know if the decision was right or wrong, but we didn't have a choice." Taiji's last concert with the band was on January 7, 1992, the last day of three consecutive nights at the Tokyo Dome. It was released on DVD as On the Verge of Destruction 1992.1.7 Tokyo Dome Live.

1992–2006: Loudness, D.T.R, Cloud Nine
In April 1992, he was invited to join Japanese metal band Loudness. He left them in November 1993, after recording only one studio album and one live album. In July 1994, he formed his own band and named it D.T.R, which stood for "Dirty Trashroad" and featured Mitsuo Takeuchi (ex:Joe-Erk) on vocals, Taiji Fujimoto (ex:The Dead Pop Stars, ex:Judy and Mary) on guitar and Toshihiko Okabe on drums.

In 1995, he also joined the short-lived supergroup Kings, with Shuichi Aoiki (Night Hawks) on vocals, Luke Takamura (Seikima-II) on guitar, and Satoshi "Joe" Miyawaki (44 Magnum, Spread Beaver) as support drummer.

Guitarist Tomoyuki Kuroda later joined D.T.R in 1995, but a year later, Yoshihiko left, and then the band was put on hold when Taiji was going through personal problems. During this time, Taiji was divorced from his wife, of whom he married in 1989, and became homeless.

In 1999, he created Cloud Nine, but left in 2001 and they decided to continue on without him. He then formed  with his sister Masayo on vocals, they released one self-titled album on November 9, 2004.

In 2005 Taiji was in a motorcycle accident, where he badly injured the ligaments in his foot. D.T.R resumed activity in 2006 with keyboardist Kenji Shimizu and their former support drummer Kazuhisa "Roger" Takahashi, now official members.

2006–2009: Taiji with Heaven's, the Killing Red Addiction
Also in April 2006, he formed another band, Taiji with Heaven's, with Taiji on bass and Dai on vocals; later guitarist Ryutaro joined. In 2009, they officially started activities; in May 2010, Takanari joined on drums and they released their first mini-album on January 13, 2010.

In 2007, Taiji returned to Cloud Nine. In 2009, he announced that he would once again be playing bass in a supergroup, The Killing Red Addiction with guitarist Tatsu (Gastunk), drummer Kenzi (Anti Feminism, The Dead Pop Stars, ex:Kamaitachi) and vocalist Dynamite Tommy (ex: Color). They had their debut performance on June 22 at the Whisky a Go Go, in Los Angeles, United States. Their second performance was in Osaka, Japan at the Shinjuku Loft on December 29, and they released a cover of Gastunk's "Devil" on iTunes on January 13, 2010.

In December 2008, Taiji's staff announced on his blog that since September, his epilepsy and chronic strokes had worsened, that he was suffering from necrosis after a hip joint replacement of the femoral component on his left hip, and that on December 2, he was hospitalized again after falling and hurting his chest and throat.

2010–2011: TSP, Reunited with X
In 2010, he formed TSP (Taiji & Shu Project), with Taiji on bass, guitarist Shu (Cloud Nine, Crazy Quarter Mile), vocalist Dai (Taiji with Heaven's) and drummer Hina (Crazy Quarter Mile). Taiji with Heaven's also performed a show in Korea that year and later announced plans for further activities in the country the following year. However, these were cancelled due to the 2011 Tōhoku earthquake and tsunami.

On August 12, 2010, Taiji rejoined X (now known as X Japan), with founders Yoshiki and Toshi at a press conference, to announce that he would be performing as a guest with X Japan at their August 14 and 15 shows at Nissan Stadium in Yokohama.

On October 9, it was announced that Dai was leaving TSP, and would be replaced by Hiroshi "Tazz" Maruki, which resulted in their debut album being delayed.

On January 23, 2011, it was announced that Ryutaro was withdrawing from Taiji with Heaven's due to bad health and personal reasons. On February 17, Tokiya joined as guitarist, and it was announced that Taiji with Heavens would now be written without the apostrophe.

2011: Arrest and death
On July 11, 2011, Taiji argued with his female manager, named KT, on Delta Airlines Flight 298 during the final approach from Japan to Saipan. After the argument became physical, he was restrained by other passengers and a flight attendant, and he was moved to another seat, but his aggression persisted as he continued to punch windows and kick other seats. He was arrested upon landing in Saipan. He faced federal charges in the United States District Court for the Northern Mariana Islands. On July 14, Taiji was found unconscious in his detention cell, appearing to have attempted suicide by hanging himself with a bed sheet. He was rushed to an intensive care unit at Saipan's Commonwealth Health Center, where he was observed to be brain dead. His comatose body was placed on life support. Taiji died on July 17 after his mother and fiancée made the decision to turn off his life support system. His fiancée, Tomomi Akatsuka, claimed that there were no marks of strangulation on his neck. In her 2015 book, Taiji, she wrote that she asked that his body be returned to Japan, but it was instead cremated without an autopsy. She started a petition called: "Taiji voiceless truth" pleading for the investigation into his death be reopened.

Discography
 "Jungle" (June 15, 2000)
 Came with Taiji's autobiography titled Uchuu o Kakeru Tomo e: Densetsu no Bando X no Sei to Shi.
 "Rain Song" (December 12, 2000)
 Came with a photobook titled Photograph.

 With Dementia
 Dementia Live! (June 1985)

 With X

 With Loudness
 "Black Widow" (May 25, 1992), Oricon Peak Position: #30
 Loudness (June 10, 1992) #2
 "Slaughter House" (August 25, 1992) #40
 Once and for All (April 25, 1993) #48

 With D.T.R
 Dirty Trashroad (July 1, 1994) #13
 Dirty Trashroad ~ Acoustic (July 1, 1994) #18
 "Chain<>/I Believe..." (May 25, 1995)
 Daring Tribal Roar (May 25, 1995) #35
 Drive To Revolution (August 1, 1996, live and remix compilation album)
 "Wisdom/Lucifer" (November 10, 2007)

 With Kings
 "Misty Eyes" (October 25, 1995)
 Kings (November 1, 1995) #36

 With Cloud Nine
 "Bastard" (November 2000)
 "1st Demonstration" (February 2001)
 Hard 'N' Heavy Religion 2 (February 14, 2008, with the song "Hells Rage")
 Various artists compilation album in Vol. 3 of We Rock magazine.
 Hard 'N' Heavy 2010 (February 13, 2010, with the song "Bastard")
 Various artists compilation album in Vol. 15 of We Rock magazine.

 With Otokaze
 Otokaze (November 9, 2004)

 With The Killing Red Addiction
 "Devil" (January 13, 2010)

 With Taiji with Heaven's
 Taiji with Heaven's (February 13, 2010)
 Hard 'N' Heavy 2010 (February 13, 2010, with the song "Keep the Faith")
 Various artists compilation album in Vol. 15 of We Rock magazine.
 Hard 'N' Heavy Religion 2012 (February 14, 2012, with the song "Killer")
 Various artists compilation album in Vol. 27 of We Rock magazine.
 The Virgin (February 28, 2015)

 With TSP
 Hard 'N' Heavy Religion 2011 (May 14, 2011, with the song "Rest in Peace")
 Various artists compilation album in Vol. 21 of We Rock magazine.
 Hard 'N' Heavy Religion 2012 (February 14, 2012, with the song "Freeze")
 Various artists compilation album in Vol. 27 of We Rock magazine.
 Mad Cluster (June 6, 2012)
 The Last Resistance of the Firebird (September 26, 2012)

Other work
 The Inner Gates (Baki, December 16, 1989, bass on "Taste of Flower", "A Kiss in the Storm" and "Flying")
 Cozy Powell Forever (Various artists, September 19, 1998, bass on "Kill the King")
 Vol. 21 of Rockin 'f magazine (June 14, 2006)
 Various artists compilation DVD, features an interview with Taiji, rehearsal and other footage.
 Vol. 24 of Rockin 'f magazine (December 14, 2006)
 Various artists compilation DVD, features an interview, studio rehearsal and live footage of D.T.R.
 Attitude the Original Soundtrack -Fuck the System- (July 2008, music director for the movie)
 Higuchi Munetaka Tsuitō Live 2009: Munetaka Higuchi Forever Our Hero (July 14, 2010, concert DVD)
 Vol. 17 of We Rock magazine (December 14, 2010)
 Various artists compilation DVD, features an interview with Taiji and Dai from Taiji with Heaven's, and live performances of "Black Vampire" and "Freeze" by TSP from April 24, 2010.
 Legend of Phoenix (December 14, 2011)
 Tribute DVD to Taiji in Vol. 26 of We Rock magazine, composed of various footage of his bands from 2000 to 2011, mostly those included within issues of Rockin 'f and We Rock.
 Everlasting Higuchi Munetaka 2010: Higuchi Munetaka Tsuitō Live Vol. 2 (February 8, 2012, concert DVD)

References

Further reading
  by Taiji Sawada, Tokuma Shoten, 2000, 
  by Tomomi Akatsuka, Takarajimasha, 2015,

External links
 
 Official blog
 The Killing Red Addiction Official MySpace

1966 births
2011 deaths
X Japan members
Loudness (band) members
Visual kei musicians
Japanese rock bass guitarists
Japanese heavy metal bass guitarists
People from Ichikawa, Chiba
Suicides by hanging in the Northern Mariana Islands
Musicians from Chiba Prefecture
20th-century Japanese male musicians
20th-century bass guitarists
21st-century Japanese male musicians
21st-century bass guitarists
Japanese songwriters
2011 suicides
People who committed suicide in prison custody
Prisoners who died in United States federal government detention
Japanese people who died in prison custody
Japanese people imprisoned abroad